Hilo, Hawaii, is a town and census-designated place on the island of Hawaii. 

Hilo may also refer to:

 Hilo Chen (born 1942), Taiwanese-born American painter
 Isaac Chelo, also spelled Helo, 14th century rabbi
 Sattar Jabbar Hilo, Mandaean priest from Iraq
 the title character of Judd Winick's Hilo graphic novel series
 Hilo International Airport, Hawaii
 Hilo High School, Hawaii
 Hilo (soil), the official state soil of Hawaii
 Ilo, Peru, a port city that was sometimes spelled Hilo
 , a yacht used as a motor torpedo boat tender during World War II
 HiLo, a supermarket in Trinidad and Tobago – see Cannings Foods Limited
 342431 Hilo, an asteroid

See also
 Hiló Formation, a geological formation in the Colombian Andes
 The HiLo Club (also Hilo or Hi-Lo), a bar and nightclub in Oklahoma City, Oklahoma, United States
 Hi-Lo (disambiguation)